Stonhouse is a surname. Notable people with the surname include:

 George Stonhouse (1603–1675), English politician
 John Stonhouse (disambiguation), multiple people

See also
 Stonhouse baronets
 Stenhouse (disambiguation)
 Stonehouse (disambiguation)